Constanze Blum (born 29 October 1972) is a German cross-country skier who competed from 1993 to 2003. At the 1998 Winter Olympics in Nagano, she earned her best career finish of fifth in the 4 x 5 km relay and her best individual finish of 21st in the 15 km event.

Blum's best finish at the FIS Nordic World Ski Championships was 17th in the 30 km event at Thunder Bay, Ontario in 1995. Her best World Cup finish was sixth in a 15 km event in Japan in 1995.

Blum earned eight individual career victories at lesser events up to 15 km from 1996 to 2000.

Cross-country skiing results
All results are sourced from the International Ski Federation (FIS).

Olympic Games

World Championships

World Cup

Season standings

References

External links

Women's 4 x 5 km cross-country relay Olympic results: 1976-2002 

1972 births
Cross-country skiers at the 1998 Winter Olympics
German female cross-country skiers
Living people
Olympic cross-country skiers of Germany